Jonathan Christian Davis (born February 27, 2002) is an American professional basketball player for the Washington Wizards of the National Basketball Association (NBA). He played college basketball for the Wisconsin Badgers  and was drafted tenth overall by the Wizards in the 2022 NBA draft.

High school career
Davis played basketball for La Crosse Central High School in La Crosse, Wisconsin. He won a Division 2 state title as a freshman. In his junior season, Davis averaged 23 points and nine rebounds per game, earning La Crosse Tribune Player of the Year honors. As a senior, he averaged 27.4 points and 9.2 rebounds per game. He was named Wisconsin Mr. Basketball and repeated as La Crosse Tribune Player of the Year. Davis left as his school's all-time leading scorer with 2,158 career points. He committed to playing college basketball for Wisconsin over offers from Marquette, Iowa and Minnesota, among others.

Davis also played football for La Crosse Central as a quarterback. In his senior season, he earned Large Schools First Team All-State honors and won the Dave Krieg Award as the most outstanding senior quarterback in Wisconsin.

College career
On February 2, 2021, Davis scored a freshman season-high 17 points, shooting 6-of-7 from the field, in a 72–56 win over Penn State. As a freshman, he came off the bench, averaging seven points and 4.1 rebounds per game while leading his team with 34 steals. On November 23, 2021, Davis scored 30 points in a 65–63 upset of Houston. He scored a career-high 37 points and had 14 rebounds on January 3, 2022, in a 74–69 upset of Purdue. As a sophomore, he averaged 19.7 points and 8.2 rebounds per game. Davis was named Big Ten Player of the Year. On March 31, 2022, Davis declared for the 2022 NBA draft, forgoing his remaining college eligibility.

Professional career

Washington Wizards (2022–present) 
Davis was selected with the tenth overall pick by the Washington Wizards in the 2022 NBA draft. Davis joined the Wizards' 2022 NBA Summer League roster. In his Summer League debut, Davis scored six points on 1-for-11 shooting in a 99–105 loss to the Detroit Pistons.

National team career
Davis represented the United States at the 2021 FIBA Under-19 World Cup in Latvia. He averaged 4.1 points per game, helping his team win the gold medal.

Career statistics

College

|-
| style="text-align:left;"| 2020–21
| style="text-align:left;"| Wisconsin
| 31 || 0 || 24.3 || .441 || .389 || .727 || 4.1 || 1.1 || 1.1 || .6 || 7.0
|-
| style="text-align:left;"| 2021–22
| style="text-align:left;"| Wisconsin
| 31 || 31 || 34.2 || .427 || .306 || .791 || 8.2 || 2.1 || 1.2 || .7 || 19.7
|- class="sortbottom"
| style="text-align:center;" colspan="2"| Career
| 62 || 31 || 29.2 || .431 || .325 || .779 || 6.2 || 1.6 || 1.1 || .7 || 13.4

Personal life
Davis' father, Mark, played professional basketball for 13 seasons, including stints in the National Basketball Association, following a college career at Old Dominion. His twin brother, Jordan, plays college basketball for Wisconsin and was his basketball and football teammate in high school. Prior to the Draft, Davis appeared in a Taco Bell commercial promoting the chain's Toasted Cheddar Chalupa.
On September 22, 2022, Davis announced the birth of his daughter, Sky, with girlfriend Jessica Bruchs on Instagram.

References

External links

Wisconsin Badgers bio
USA Basketball bio

2002 births
Living people
All-American college men's basketball players
American men's basketball players
Basketball players from Wisconsin
Shooting guards
Small forwards
Sportspeople from La Crosse, Wisconsin
Twin sportspeople
Washington Wizards draft picks
Washington Wizards players
Wisconsin Badgers men's basketball players